Amirabad (also Romanized as Amīrābād; also known as Khord Narvān, Khūrd Nārvān, and Khvord Nārvān) is a village in Dastgerdan Rural District, Dastgerdan District, Tabas County, South Khorasan Province, Iran. At the 2006 census, its population was 128, in 39 families.

References 

Populated places in Tabas County